Roy Masters (born 2 April 1928, died 22 April 2021) was an English-born American author, radio personality, businessman and hypnotist. He was the creator of a type of mindfulness meditation exercise, which has appeared in his books and recordings. Masters is the founder of the Oregon non-profit organization, the Foundation of Human Understanding. His forays into radio broadcasting included his own show, Advice Line, and the Talk Radio Network, a short-lived but popular conservative talk radio syndicator.

Roy Masters died in Oregon on April 22, 2021.

Early life in Britain
Roy Masters was born Reuben Obermeister in London in 1928 to a Jewish family of diamond cutters. Like his father, Boris, Masters uses the common anglicisation of his original surname.

Masters' father died in 1943, when Masters was 15 years old. His family could only afford education for his older brother, so Masters did not attend college. He was sent to Brighton, England to apprentice in diamond cutting at his uncle's company, Monnickendam Ltd.

Career

Diamond cutting  
Masters made implausible claims to have served in the Royal Sussex Regiment of the British Army during World War II; however, Masters was only 11 years old when the United Kingdom entered the war. Following the war, he apprenticed in diamond cutting. He pursued his trade in many places, including Amsterdam; Brussels; Belgium; and Johannesburg in 1947, where he spent two years.

In 1949, Masters immigrated to the United States. In his early twenties, he traveled across America, lecturing on the topic of diamond cutting in 40 different states. He was invited to participate in radio and TV interviews on the subject, and briefly hosted a daily radio show called Story of Your Diamond.

Masters met and married his wife Ann in Birmingham, Alabama, and they eventually moved to Houston, Texas. He developed an interest in hypnosis, and sold his diamond cutting business to start a new company, the Institute of Hypnosis.

Lessons in hypnotism
During his early years in Brighton, Masters saw a stage hypnosis presentation where the hypnotist easily induced volunteer subjects to do strange and outlandish things. Masters remembered pondering the question: "Why can't hypnotism be used to make people act sensibly, rather than foolishly?"

Upon further exploration of hypnotism in the 1950s, Masters repudiated hypnotherapy, but he soon opened the Institute of Hypnosis in Houston. There, he saw as many as 30 clients a day for consultation, where he says he "unhypnotised" them instead of hypnotizing them.

Masters called hypnosis a "duplication of life's errors":

About his changing professions from diamond cutting, Masters said in an interview "I had my own business, but I left that lucrative work because I had a calling for this kind of work. I'm more interested in what I'm doing now than anything else."

Masters set the precedent for the legality of non-medical practice of hypnosis when he was charged with practicing medicine without a license at age 30. He was sentenced to serve 30 days in jail.
(For the medical practice of hypnotism, see hypnotism precursors, such as Dave Elman.)

The Foundation for Human Understanding 
Masters lived in Los Angeles, California, buying a house trailer and living in Venice, CA in 1961.  He later profited from his investment in gold at its price highs in 1980 and purchased Tall Timber Ranch in Selma, Oregon, and relocated his family to Grants Pass, Oregon, where he moved the non-profit Foundation of Human Understanding. He produced an observational or meditation recording titled How Your Mind Can Keep You Well, which became the title of his radio show and one of his books.

Talk radio show 
In 1961, Masters started a talk radio counseling show, which is currently broadcast under the name Advice Line, as a syndicated program. The show has been on the air continuously since its start. Masters passed hosting duties to his sons, David and Alan, shortly before his death.

Media appearances
Masters has appeared on CNN's Crossfire, Larry King Live, The Sally Jessy Raphael Show, The Sean Hannity Show, and The Drudge Report.

Publications
 1964 The Secrets of Life and Death.  :Devorss, 1964. 
 1965 How to Be at Peace With Your Problems. Oregon: Foundation of Human Understanding, 1965. 
 1970 Sex, Sin & Solution. Oregon: Foundation of Human Understanding, 1970. 
 1970 (Roy Masters Speaks On) Breaking Free of Psycho-therapy. Oregon: Foundation of Human Understanding, 1970. 
 1972  The Secret of Life. Oregon: Foundation of Human Understanding, 1972  and as Secret of Life. (pbk) 1977. [ASIN: B000KVIIQM]
 1973 Your Mind Can Keep You Well, Fawcett Publications, 1973. (Essandess Special Edition, 1968. )
 1974 (Roy Masters Speaks On) Understanding Meditation. Oregon: Foundation of Human Understanding, 1974, 
 1975 How to Control Your Emotions. Oregon: Foundation of Human Understanding, 1975. 
 1975 How to Conquer Negative Emotions (with Mel Tappan). Oregon: Foundation of Human Understanding, 1 June 1975. 
 1976 How to Conquer Suffering Without Doctors. Oregon: Foundation of Human Understanding, June 1976. 
 1977 Sex, Sin & Salvation. Oregon: Foundation of Human Understanding, 1977. 
 1977 No One Has to Die! Oregon: Foundation of Human Understanding, 1977. 
 1978 How Your Mind Can Keep You Well Oregon: Foundation of Human Understanding, 1 June 1978.  (Fawcett Crest Book, 1973)
 1979 The Satan Principle: Life Itself Is Hypnosis: Self-Defense Lessons to Help You Cope With Everyday Pressure. Oregon: Foundation of Human Understanding, June 1979.  (earlier version: Life Itself Is Hypnosis: The Satan Principle: Self-Defense Lessons to Help You Cope With Everyday Pressure, Foundation Books, 1978. )
 1982 How to Survive Your Parents: And Not Do to Your Children What Your Parents Did to You. Oregon: Foundation of Human Understanding, 1 June 1982. (pbk) 
 1987 Eat No Evil (with Dorothy Baker). Oregon: Foundation of Human Understanding, June 1987. (pbk) 
 1988 Understanding Sexuality: The Mystery of Our Lost Identities (with Dorothy Baker).  Oregon: Foundation of Human Understanding, rev. ed., February 1988.  
 1988 Beyond the Known (with Dorothy Baker). Oregon: Foundation of Human Understanding, Rev. Ed., 1 June 1988. 
 1988 The Hypnosis of Life: Self-Defense Lessons to Help You Cope with Every Day Pressure. Oregon: Foundation of Human Understanding, June 1988. 
 1988 The Secret Power of Words: Why Words Affect You So Deeply. Oregon: Foundation of Human Understanding, 1 June 1988. (pbk) 
 1991 Surviving the Comfort Zone (with Dorothy Baker). Oregon: Foundation of Human Understanding, 1 August 1991. 
 1992 Secrets of a Parallel Universe: Why Our Deepest Problems Hold the Key to Ultimate Personal Success and Happiness. Oregon: Foundation of Human Understanding, June 1992. 
 1997 Finding God in Physics: Einstein's Missing Relative (with Bob Just and Dorothy Baker). Oregon: Foundation of Human Understanding, 
 2001 The Adam and Eve Sindrome. Oregon: Foundation of Human Understanding, January 2001. 
 2010 How Your Mind Will Make You Well (an updated version of How Your Mind Can Keep You Well). Oregon: CreateSpace, 1 December 2010 
 2011 Hypnotic States of Americans: A spiritual survival manual for every American family in a perilous world. Oregon: CreateSpace, 11 May 2011. 
 2012 Cure Stress: How Your Mind Will Make You Well. Oregon: CreateSpace, 11 December 2012

References

External links
 
 Roy Masters' biography

1928 births
2021 deaths
American hypnotists
Christian writers
English emigrants to the United States
English Jews
People from Josephine County, Oregon
People from London
Radio personalities from Oregon
Diamond cutting